Bogor Raya Football Club was an Indonesian football club based in Great Bogor (Bogor City and Bogor Regency), West Java. The team plays in Liga Primer Indonesia.

Team officials

References

External links
Bogor Raya FC Official Site
Bogor Raya FC at ligaprimerindonesia.co.id

Defunct football clubs in Indonesia
Football clubs in Indonesia
Association football clubs established in 2010
2010 establishments in Indonesia